WRE, or wre, may refer to:
 Weapons Research Establishment, an Australian military program now part of the Defence Science and Technology Group
 Weekday Religious Education, a program of religious education in some American public schools
 Western Roman Empire
 WRE, the IATA code for Whangarei Airport on the North Island, New Zealand
 wre, the ISO 639-3 code for the Ware language, an extinct language once spoken near Lake Victoria in East Africa
 WRE, the National Rail code for Wrenbury railway station in Cheshire, UK

See also